"Never Lie" is a song by IMx (then known as Immature), issued as the lead single from the group's second album Playtyme is Over. The song was their biggest hit on the Billboard Hot 100, peaking at #5 in 1994. It was certified gold on September 29, 1994 and sold 700,000 copies.

Charts

Weekly charts

Year-end charts

Samples
The song was later sampled in Lil Mosey's track "Kamikaze".

References

External links

1994 singles
IMx songs
Songs written by Chris Stokes (director)
1994 songs
MCA Records singles
Contemporary R&B ballads
1990s ballads